James Fenton (5 June 1931 – 3 February 2021) was a linguist and poet who wrote in Ulster Scots.

Biography
He grew up in Drumdarragh and in Ballinaloob, County Antrim. His home language of childhood was Ulster Scots. Educated at Stranmillis College in Belfast, and later Queen's University, he became a teacher at schools in Belfast.

His poetry in Ulster Scots, at times lively, contented, wistful, was written in contemporary Ulster Scots, and particularly the dialect of Ballinaloob ("Belnaloob" in his poem Thonner an Thon).

Books
James Fenton's record and study of Scots and Scots words used in Ulster, The Hamely Tongue has been published by the Ullans Press. A collection of his own poetry has been published by the Ullans Press too; Thonner an Thon.

James Fenton lived in Glengormley, Newtownabbey.

Death
Fenton died on 3 February 2021, aged 89.

References

External links
 The Ulster-Scots Language Society
 The Hamely Tongue - Ulster-Scots Academy
 The Ulster-Scots Agency

1931 births
2021 deaths
Male poets from Northern Ireland
Alumni of Queen's University Belfast
Male writers from Northern Ireland
Alumni of Stranmillis University College
Schoolteachers from Northern Ireland
Ulster Scots-language poets